Xosé Luís Méndez Ferrín (Ourense, 7 August 1938) is a Galician writer and poet and is widely considered the highest representative of contemporary Galician literature. A doctor in philology, he studied philosophy at the University of Santiago de Compostela and Romanic philology at the University of Madrid.

He teaches literature at the Instituto Santa Irene in Vigo. He also writes for the daily newspaper Faro de Vigo and directs the quarterly political critic magazine A Trabe Ouro. Ferrín is a member of the Real Academia Galega (Galician Royal Academy). He was the president of that Academy from January 2010 until February 2013, when he resigned, accused of hiring relatives . On 1 March 2013 he resigned his chair of academic . He is Doctor Honoris Causa of the University of Vigo.

He was proposed to the Nobel Prize in literature by the Galician Writers Association in 1999. He has been awarded with the Galician Critics Prize, Spanish Critics Prize and National Critics Prize.

Politics
Ferrín maintains an active political activist life. Supporting political and social initiatives as Redes Escarlata. He is a member of the nationalist literary group Brais Pinto.

He was a founding member of Unión do Povo Galego (Union of the Galician People) and centered in a marxist independentist ideology. Also member of Frente Popular Galega (Popular Galician Front) and founder of Galiza Ceibe-OLN.

Literary work
As a poet he became notorious with his first work Voce na néboa (Voice in the fog) 1957.
 Antoloxía Popular (popular anthology) 1972, with the pseudonym Heriberto Bens.
 Sirventés pola destrucción de Occitania (Servants for the destruction of Occitania) 1975.
 Con pólvora e magnolias (With gunpowder and magnolias) 1977.
 Poesía enteira de Heriberto Bens (Complete poetry of Heriberto Bens) 1980.
 O fin dun canto (The end of a singing) 1982.
 Erótica (Erotic) 1992.
 Estirpe (Breed/Lineage) 1994.
 O outro (The other one) 2002.
  Contra Maquieiro (Against Maquieiro) 2005

His works in prose, include narrative and essay.
 Percival e outras historias (Percival and other stories) 1958.
 O crepúsculo e as formigas (The twilight and the ants) 1961.
 Arrabaldo do norte (Arrabaldo north) 1964.
 Retorno a Tagen Ata (Return to Tagen Ata) 1971.
 Elipsis e outras sombras (Ellipsis and other shadows) 1974.
 Antón e os inocentes (Antón and the innocents) 1976.
 Crónica de nós (Chronicles of us) 1980.
 Amor de Artur (The love of Artur) 1982.
 Arnoia, Arnoia 1985.
 Bretaña Esmeraldina 1987.
 De Pondal a Novoneyra (From Pondal to Novoneyra) 1984.
 Arraianos 1991
 No ventre do silencio (Inside the womb of the silence) 1999.

External links
 UPG Website
 Redes Escarlata Website
 Galician Royal Academy

1938 births
Living people
People from Ourense
Galician poets
Galician-language writers